Rock Dinner is a 2008–2013 television series on MTV Tr3s where people in the Los Angeles area cooked dinner for their favorite Latino artists. The artists included Flex, Rakim, Ken-Y, Enrique Iglesias, Kat DeLuna, and Reik.

A version of the show was produced in Mexico City by MTV Latin America, hosted by Colombian model Carolina Guerra.

See also
 List of dining events

References

2000s American cooking television series
2000s American music television series
2010s American cooking television series
2010s American music television series
Dining events